Gladiovalva badidorsella is a moth of the family Gelechiidae. It was described by Rebel in 1935. It is found in Portugal, Spain and southern Russia.

References

Moths described in 1935
Gladiovalva